Lovers is a 2020 French romantic thriller film directed by Nicole Garcia, from a screenplay by Garcia and Jacques Fieschi. It stars Stacy Martin, Pierre Niney and Benoît Magimel.

It had its world premiere at the Venice Film Festival on 3 September 2020.

Cast
 Stacy Martin as Lisa
 Pierre Niney as Simon
 Benoît Magimel as Léo Redler
 Christophe Montenez as Pierre-Henri
 Nicolas Wanczycki as Lisa's father
 Grégoire Colin as Paul
 Roxane Duran as Nathalie

Plot
Tragic, fatalistic love story. In Paris, young lovers, student Lisa (Stacy Martin) and drug dealer Simon (Pierre Niney), split when Simon has to flee the country. Heartbroken Lisa soon meets older and wealthy Léo (Benoît Magimel).

There are three locales, Paris, Mauritius and Geneva. We move from place to place as Lisa changes from girlfriend of a drug dealer to housewife of a rich businessman, to both when having an affair with Simon while married to Léo.

On Mauritius, the gorgeous surroundings contrast with Lisa being miserable and Léo almost forcing himself on her. Then, Simon turns up as a tour guide at their resort.

Lisa makes the men around her suffer while trying not to hurt anybody. Simon is a con-man with no options but Lisa and her money. Léo, who has a shady past, hopes to buy happiness.

Léo hires Simon as his driver. It looks like they could become friends, until Léo discards Simon like a used Kleenex.

In this world of haves and have-nots, of serve-or-be-served, you’re either young, poor and in love, or older, rich and despairing. Lisa is caught between Simon and Léo, and either leads to ruin.

Production
In December 2018, it was announced Stacy Martin, Pierre Niney and Benoît Magimel had joined the cast of the film, with Nicole Garcia directing from a screenplay she co-wrote with Jacques Fieschi.

Release
The film had its world premiere at the Venice Film Festival on 3 September 2020.

References

External links
 

2020 films
2020s romantic thriller films
French romantic thriller films
Films directed by Nicole Garcia
Films set in Paris
Films shot in Paris
Films set in Oceania
Films set in Switzerland
Films shot in Switzerland
2020s French films